The posterior ethmoidal artery is an artery of the head which arises from the ophthalmic artery to supply the posterior ethmoidal air cells, and the meninges. It is smaller than the anterior ethmoidal artery.

Anatomy

Origin 
The posterior ethmoidal artery is an orbital branch of the ophthalmic artery.

Course and relations 
After branching from the ophthalmic artery, the posterior ethmoidal artery passes between the upper border of the medial rectus muscle and superior oblique muscle to reach, enter and traverse the posterior ethmoidal canal.

Branches 
Meningeal branch

It emits a meningeal branch to the dura mater after entering the cranium.

Nasal branches

It emits nasal branches that pass through the cribriform plate to reach the nasal cavity. The nasal branches form anastomoses with the sphenopalatine artery.

Distribution 
This artery supplies the posterior ethmoidal air sinuses, the dura mater of the anterior cranial fossa, and the upper part of the nasal mucosa of the nasal septum.

References

External links
 
 http://www.dartmouth.edu/~humananatomy/figures/chapter_45/45-6.HTM

Arteries of the head and neck